half-ALIVE was the first official live album by Canadian heavy metal band Helix, following the promotional-only Live At The Marquee.  It was also their 11th album altogether and featured five new studio songs.  It was their only release on DeROCK Records and was recorded at various gigs throughout the 1990s.

History

half-ALIVE features varying lineups of Helix, as the band's  membership was in a state of flux following the death of guitarist Paul Hackman and the tour for It's a Business Doing Pleasure.  In 1997, original member Brian Vollmer and longtime bassist Daryl Gray had to decide whether to keep the band going or to break up.  Choosing to stay together, a new release was required or, according to Vollmer, "the live dates were sure to slowly dry up. We had several tracks which were never recorded plus a live album still in the cans, so we decided on putting out a CD which would contain some unreleased tracks and the rest live material."  The studio songs included one written but never recorded by bass player Mike Uzelac who was in Helix from 1980 to 1983.

Track listing and musician credits

Studio songs

1. Shock City Psycho Rock (Mike Uzelac)  
Brian Vollmer - lead vocals
Daryl Gray - bass, vocals, keyboards, percussion, talk box, kazoo
Greg "Fritz" Hinz - drums
Gary Borden - rhythm guitars
Mark Chichkan - lead and slide guitars, vocals
Tim Louis - honky tonk piano
Jenifer St. John - piano and keyboards

2. Wrecking Ball (Mark Chichkan, Brian Vollmer, Daryl Gray, Gary Borden, Greg Hinz)
Brian Vollmer - lead vocals
Daryl Gray - bass, vocals, piano, percussion
Greg "Fritz" Hinz - drums & cowbell
Gary Borden - rhythm guitars
Mark Chichkan - lead guitars, vocals

3. The Pusher (Hoyt Axton)
Brian Vollmer - lead vocals
Dary Gray - bass, keyboards, percussion
Greg "Fritz" Hinz - drums
Gary Borden - rhythm guitars
Brent "The Doctor" Doerner - guitar and solos

4. Big Bang Boom (Vollmer, Marc Ribler)
Brian Vollmer - lead vocals
Daryl Gray - bass, percussion
Greg "Fritz" Hinz - drums
Paul Hackman - guitars
Brent "The Doctor" Doerner - guitars

5. The Same Room (Bushey, Chip Gall, Huff, Weir)
Brian Vollmer - lead vocals
Dary Gray - acoustic guitar, keyboards, percussion, vocals
Jamie Constant - drums
Rick Mead - guitars
Chip Gall - guitars
Doug Ennis - cello

Live songs

6. No Rest For The Wicked (Vollmer)
7. Dirty Dog (Vollmer, Brent Doerner)
8. Runnin' Wild In The 21st Century (Vollmer, Hackman)
Brian Vollmer - lead vocals
Daryl Gray - bass, vocals
Greg "Fritz" Hinz - drums
Gary Borden - guitar, vocals
Mark Chichkan - lead guitar, vocals

9. Animal House (Vollmer, Hackman)
Brian Vollmer - lead vocals
Daryl Gray - bass, vocals
Greg "Fritz" Hinz - drums
Paul Hackman - guitar, vocals
Denny Balicki - guitar, vocals

10. When The Hammer Falls (Vollmer, Hackman)
Brian Vollmer - lead vocals
Daryl Gray - bass, vocals
Greg "Fritz" Hinz - drums
Gary Borden - guitar, vocals
Mark Chichkan - lead guitar, vocals

11. Deep Cuts The Knife (Bob Halligan, Jr., Hackman)
Brian Vollmer - lead vocals
Daryl Gray - bass, keyboards, vocals
Glen "Archie" Gamble - drums
Gary Borden - lead guitars
Rick Mead - guitars

12. Smile (Borden)
Gary Borden - acoustic guitar

13. Good To The Last Drop (Vollmer, Ribler)
Brian Vollmer - lead vocals
Daryl Gray - bass, vocals
Greg "Fritz" Hinz - drums
Gary Borden - guitar, vocals
Mark Chichkan - lead guitar, vocals

14. Heavy Metal Love (Vollmer, Hackman)
Brian Vollmer - lead vocals
Daryl Gray - bass, keyboards, vocals
Glen "Archie" Gamble - drums
Gary Borden - lead guitars
Rick Mead - guitars

15. Wild In The Streets (Hackman, Ray Lyell)
16. Rock You (Halligan)
Brian Vollmer - lead vocals
Daryl Gray - bass, vocals
Greg "Fritz" Hinz - drums
Paul Hackman - guitar, vocals
Denny Balicki - guitar, vocals

Credits
Produced by Daryl Gray
Mixed by Dan Brodbeck at DB Record Studios, London, Ontario

Helix at the time of release
Brian Vollmer - lead vocals
Daryl Gray - bass, keyboards, vocals
Glen "Archie" Gamble - drums
Gary Borden - guitars
Rick Mead - guitars
Mark Chichkan - guitars

Videos
"The Same Room" was filmed for a never-released video.

References

Helix (band) albums
1998 live albums